Swelter is a rock music group, formed in 1989.  They were generally associated with the city of Tacoma, Washington.

Biography
1989–91

Swelter was initially formed as a 4 piece band consisting of Micah Hembree (vocals), Chad Baker (bass guitar), Stuart Linkert (drums), and Jason Harsin (guitar). Originally named Swelter Cacklebush, the group played in a heavy pop/rock style, different than the more aggressive sound of their later recordings.

After recording their debut Country Pleasures EP, the group was signed to a local independent label, Green Monkey Records, headed by Seattle area producer Tom Dyer (Accüsed, Green Pajamas, Malchicks). A 7" release accompanied by positive reviews in local Northwest music magazines Backlash and The Rocket followed, and a series of shows were lined up at venues in the area. At the same time Harsin left to form a folk-inspired group called Katie's Dimples. The group attempted to find a suitable replacement, but a few months later Linkert would also join Katie's Dimples. Swelter Cacklebush was declared clinically dead.

1991–93

In 1993 Linkert departed from Katie's Dimples, and he and the other remaining members decide to reform, dropping "Cacklebush" from the name, and expanding the lineup to a quintet by adding Jason Dietrich and David Takata on guitar. They dropped the pop songwriting elements from their sound and focused on the darker and more aggressive sounds of the underground hard rock scene that was growing in the Pacific Northwest, while adding elements of the Midwestern Post-Hardcore or "Noise Rock" movement typified by bands such as The Laughing Hyenas and Scratch Acid.e-

Many shows were played in the South Puget Sound region of the Pacific Northwest. The fivpiece Swelter lineup went into the studio and recorded several tracks, two of which ("Topicrux" and "Slab Fork Creme") were later pressed onto "morning piss"-colored vinyl. The rest of the tracks would later appear remixed on their self-titled full-length album, released in 1996.  The album received positive press, as evidenced in this review from Seattle music magazine The Rocket:

SWELTER (BigEnormous)
Tacoma's Swelter have many different elements converging together, and the outcome would make any noise-band fan proud. The resultant sound is grating, mechanical, visceral, and catchy all at once. With three very loud and very distorted guitars, and distorted vocals used more as an instrument than as a lyrical element, Swelter are the perfect fix for those who worship at the throne of Noise. -Keyan Y. Meymand

1993–98

The addition of third guitar player Sean Lanksbury in late 1993 solidified the Swelter sound. They went on to record new tracks with this expanded lineup at John and Stu's place (a recording studio formerly known as Reciprocal Recording) with producer John Goodmanson. These tracks, along with the previously recorded tracks from 1993 were sequenced together to form the band's debut album, "Swelter". The band toured across the Northwest to critical favor but limited commercial success. They appeared on Dan Savage's Savage Love Live radio program in 1996, performing two new songs and two covers: "You Made Me Love You (Dear Mr. Gable)" and "You're Just Too Good To Be True", at the host's suggestion. Shortly after they recorded their second album at Uptone Studios with Scott Talbott (Nadir, Everything In Flames) in 1996. Given various titles (Black Assmaster, Yes I am unkind...but even worse, 2), it remains unreleased. One alternate version of the track "Crash And Bleed Out" can be found on a 1996 Nail Distribution sampler disc. The band, frustrated by lack of success and amidst deepening internal tension, broke up in 1998.

Music
Swelter are generally categorized as noise rock, but their music also incorporated elements of hardcore punk, metal and shoegaze.

Influences

The Jesus Lizard, Ride, Laughing Hyenas, Unsane, Unwound, Black Sabbath, Fu Manchu, Kyuss, Slug, Cherubs, Shellac, My Bloody Valentine, Six Finger Satellite, Green Magnet School, Superconductor, Melvins, Nirvana, Tar, Table.

Performed In Concert with

Silkworm, Botch, The Posies, Nadir, OneTon, Hush Harbor, Richmond Fontaine, Poppa Wheelie, The Presidents of the United States of America, Bali Girls, Rocket From The Crypt, Spiny Norman, Plugg, Helter Skipper and the Gilligan Mansons, Self Help Seminar and many others.

Discography

Country Pleasures [Cassette EP; Self-released]
"We Could" b/w "Dive" [7" Single; Green Monkey Records]
"Topicrux" b/w "Slab Fork Creme" [7" Single; Service of Fikes]
Swelter [CD; Big Enormous Records]
Yes, I am unkind...but even worse (a.k.a. Black Assmaster) [CD; Unreleased]

References

American noise rock music groups
Musical groups from Tacoma, Washington